Hyloconis luki is a moth of the family Gracillariidae. It is found in the Democratic Republic of Congo. The habitat consists of primary rainforest with an undergrowth of Fabaceae.

The forewing ground colour is ochreous with white markings, and the hind wings are grey, with the fringe slightly darker than the hindwing. Adults have been recorded on wing in late May.

Etymology
The specific name refers to the river Luki, which crosses the Mayumbe Forest, the area where the species occurs.

References

Moths described in 2012
Lithocolletinae
Insects of the Democratic Republic of the Congo
Moths of Africa
Endemic fauna of the Democratic Republic of the Congo

Taxa named by Jurate de Prins